In the first Gulf of Sidra incident, 19 August 1981, two Libyan Su-22 Fitters fired upon two U.S. F-14 Tomcats and were subsequently shot down off the Libyan coast. Libya had claimed that the entire Gulf was their territory, at 32° 30′ N, with an exclusive  fishing zone, which Libyan leader Muammar Gaddafi asserted as "The Line of Death" in 1973. Two further incidents occurred in the area in 1986 and in 1989.

Background

In 1973, Libya claimed the Gulf of Sidra as a closed bay and part of its territorial waters. This prompted the United States to conduct Freedom of Navigation (FON) operations in the area since the claim did not meet the criteria established by international law. Libya often confronted U.S. forces in and near the gulf, and on two occasions its fighter jets opened fire on U.S. reconnaissance flights off the Libyan coast; once in early 1973 and again in late 1980. FON operations intensified when Ronald Reagan became president.

The two carriers had embarked a total of four interceptor squadrons: VF-74 "Be-Devilers" and VMFA-115 "Silver Eagles", flying F-4 Phantoms from Forrestal, and the VF-41 "Black Aces" and VF-84 "Jolly Rogers", flying F-14 Tomcats from Nimitz. The Libyan Air Force responded by deploying a high number of interceptors and fighter-bombers.

Early in the morning of 18 August, when the U.S. exercise began, at least three MiG-25 'Foxbats' approached the U.S. carrier groups, and were escorted away by American interceptors. The Libyans tried to establish the exact location of the U.S. naval force. Thirty-five pairs of MiG-23 'Floggers', MiG-25s, Sukhoi Su-20 'Fitter-Cs', Su-22M 'Fitter-Js' and Mirage F1s flew into the area, and were soon intercepted by seven pairs of F-14s and F-4s.

Incident
On the morning of 19 August, after having diverted a number of Libyan "mock" attacks on the battle group the previous day, two F-14s from VF-41 "Black Aces", Fast Eagle 102 (CDR Henry 'Hank' Kleemann/LT David 'DJ' Venlet) (flying BuNo 160403)<ref name="Browndavid">Brown, David F. (1998). Tomcat Alley: A Photographic Roll Call of the Grumman F-14 Tomcat”'. Schiffer Military History. pp. 99, 104. .</ref> and Fast Eagle 107 (LT Lawrence 'Music' Muczynski/LTJG James 'Luca' Anderson) (in BuNo 160390), were flying a combat air patrol (CAP), ostensibly to cover aircraft engaged in a missile exercise. However, U.S. Navy Commander Thompson S. Sanders wrote in Air & Space/Smithsonian that his S-3A Viking's mission was the real precursor to this incident. Sanders was ordered to fly his Viking in a "racetrack" orbit (oval pattern) inside Gaddafi's claimed zone but outside the internationally recognized  territorial water limit to try to provoke the Libyans to react.  An E-2C Hawkeye alerted Sanders that two Sukhoi Su-22 fighters had taken off from Ghurdabiyah Air Base near the city of Sirte.Stanik, Joseph T. (2003). El Dorado Canyon: Reagan's Undeclared War with Gaddafi. Naval Institute Press. p. 52. .  

The Hawkeye directed the F-14s to intercept.
The two F-14s set up for an intercept as the contacts headed north towards them.Martin, David C. and John Walcott. (1988). Best Laid Plans: The Inside Story of America’s War Against Terrorism. Harper and Row, Publishers Inc. p. 69 . Only a few seconds before the crossing, at an estimated distance of 300 m, one of the Libyans fired an AA-2 "Atoll" at one of the F-14s, but missed.   

The two Su-22s split as they flew past the Americans, the leader turning to the northwest and the wingman turning southeast in the direction of the Libyan coast. The Tomcats evaded the missile and were cleared to return fire by their rules of engagement, which mandated self-defense on the initiation of hostile action. Kimmitt, Robert M. (2006, August 20). "Reagan and Gadhafi". The Washington Times, Retrieved 20 January 2012. The Tomcats turned hard port and came behind the Libyan jets. The Americans fired AIM-9L Sidewinders; the first kill is credited to Fast Eagle 102, the second to Fast Eagle 107.Stanik, Joseph T. (2003). El Dorado Canyon: Reagan's Undeclared War with Qaddafi. Naval Institute Press. pp. 54–55. . Both Libyan pilots ejected.

Prior to the ejections, a U.S. electronic surveillance plane monitoring the event recorded the lead Libyan pilot reporting to his ground controller that he had fired a missile at one of the U.S. fighters and gave no indication that the missile shot was unintended.Stanik, Joseph T. (2003). El Dorado Canyon: Reagan's Undeclared War with Qaddafi. Naval Institute Press. pp. 54, 56. .

Less than an hour later, while the Libyans were conducting a search-and-rescue operation for their downed pilots, two MiG-25s entered the airspace over the Gulf. They headed towards the U.S. carriers at Mach 1.5 and conducted a mock attack in the direction of USS Nimitz. Two VF-41 Tomcats headed towards the Libyans, which then turned around. The Tomcats turned home, but had to turn around again when the Libyans headed towards the U.S. carriers once more. After being tracked by the F-14s' radars, the MiGs finally headed home. One more Libyan formation ventured out into the Gulf towards the U.S. forces later that day. 

Aftermath

Fast Eagle 102 (BuNo 160403) is now on display at the Commemorative Air Force Museum in Midland, Texas. The restored F-14 was unveiled in a ceremony in August 2016. Vice Admiral Dave Venlet cut the first tape. Fast Eagle 107 (BuNo 160390) was destroyed in an accident on 25 October 1994.

See also

 1989 air battle near Tobruk, a similar incident which occurred eight years later
 Hainan Island incident, a similar incident between the U.S. and China that occurred in 2001
 Iron Eagle, a 1986 film inspired by the incident.
 Operation El Dorado Canyon (1986)
 Top Gun'', a 1986 film whose final dogfight scene was inspired by this incident.

References

Citations

External links
 Description of the incident
 Air Aces record
 U.S. Department of State Country Study of Libya, reporting that both Libyan pilots survived.
 Naval Aviation 1911–1986: A Pictorial Study p. 91
 Actual Radio conversation recorded by U.S.S. Biddle, Aug. 19, 1981

1981 in Libya
1981 in the United States
20th-century aircraft shootdown incidents
20th-century military history of the United States
Air-to-air combat operations and battles
August 1981 events in Africa
Aviation accidents and incidents in 1981
Aviation accidents and incidents in the Mediterranean Sea
Battles and conflicts without fatalities
Cold War military history of the United States
Conflicts in 1981
Gulf of Sidra
Libya–United States military relations
Military history of Libya